Typhoon Nancy, known in the Philippines as Typhoon Weling, was a destructive typhoon that moved through Vietnam and the Philippines during October 1982. The typhoon originated from an area of convection and was first classified as a tropical cyclone on October 10. The system attained gale-force winds the next day, and slowly deepened thereafter. Although Nancy initially moved west, the system maintained a general westward course for much of its duration, striking Luzon on October 14 at peak intensity of 215 km/h (130 mph). It weakened to tropical storm strength overland, but re-intensified to typhoon intensity over the South China Sea. Nancy hit northern Vietnam on the October 18, and weakened almost immediately thereafter, before dissipating on October 20 inland over Vietnam.

In the Philippines, damage was the worst in Cagayan and Isabela. In the former, 4,378 homes were destroyed while 2,250 houses were destroyed in the latter. Nationwide, 96 people were killed and 30 others were listed as missing. Additionally, 186 were injured. A total of 12,464 homes were destroyed while 34,111 others were damaged. Moreover, 301,431 persons were "affected" by the storm, or 51,532 families. Damage totaled to $56 million (1982 USD), including $18 million from infrastructure and $26 million from agriculture. While striking Vietnam, the typhoon killed 30 people. Around 72,000 homes were destroyed, leaving 125,000 people homeless. Throughout the country, 450,000 acres (182,110 ha) of rice were destroyed.

Meteorological history

Typhoon Nancy originated from a large area of convection situated in the middle of the Pacific Ocean, which, while drifting westward, began to consolidate on October 8 within a favorable environment aloft. The convection separated from an upper-level low embedded within a tropical upper-tropospheric trough (TUTT). Later that day, the area of convection degenerated into a "random area of cloudiness." The TUTT drifted west while the Joint Typhoon Warning Center (JTWC) reported that a tropical depression formed within the area of convection that was now located south of the TUTT. Early on October 10, the Japan Meteorological Agency (JMA) started watching the system.

Following an increase in reorganization, a Hurricane Hunter flight indicated winds of  early on October 11. Later that morning, the JMA upgraded the cyclone into a tropical storm. Based on this, the JTWC upgraded the depression into a tropical storm and named it Nancy. Initially, the JTWC expected the system to track northwards and eventually re-curve, but this did not occur. Nancy maintained its intensity for 24 hours while tracking westward before rapidly turning west due to a change in steering patterns. Meanwhile, the Philippine Atmospheric, Geophysical and Astronomical Services Administration also monitored the storm and assigned it with the local name Weling. Midday on October 12, the JMA upgraded Nancy into a severe tropical storm. At 00:00 UTC on October 13, the same agency classified Nancy into a typhoon, and subsequently, the storm developed a well-defined eye. Later that day, the JTWC followed suit. By midday on October 14, the JTWC predicted Nancy to turn northwest into China due to the anticipation of a mid-latitude trough south of South Korea deepening. Meanwhile, the JTWC reported peak intensity of 215 km/h (130 mph), a Category 4 hurricane equivalent on the United States-based Saffir-Simpson Hurricane Wind Scale (SSHWS). Six hours later, Typhoon Nancy moved ashore in northern Luzon while still at peak intensity.

The storm rapidly weakened over land, with satellite images showing that the eye had quickly disappeared. Although the JTWC downgraded Nancy to a tropical storm, the JMA kept the storm at typhoon intensity throughout landfall. After entering the South China Sea, the storm initially tracked west-northwest before slowing down and turning west. Meanwhile, JTWC upped Nancy to typhoon status as it entered an area with favorable mid- to upper-level winds. Shortly thereafter, Nancy crossed Hainan Island. After weakening slightly overland, the storm resumed strengthening once offshore. The tropical cyclone moved on a slow northwesterly track along the southern periphery of the ridge. Late on October 18, Nancy made landfall along the coast of Vietnam, just north of Vinh. At the time of landfall, both agencies estimated that Nancy was a typhoon. Within hours, the convection ceased, though the JMA kept monitoring the system until October 20, when it finally dissipated.

Impact
Prior to Nancy's first landfall, typhoon warnings were issued for much of Luzon and many residents left for shelter. The typhoon passed through 10 provinces in the Philippines, resulting in widespread destruction. Damage was the worst in Cagayan and Isabela, where 56 people were hurt. In the former, 4,378 dwellings were destroyed. In Isabela, 2,250 houses were destroyed, displacing 35,744 residents. Along a river in Isabela, ten bodies were found. Elsewhere, 800 homes were destroyed in Tuguegarao, leaving 1,000 homeless and two injured. In Kalinga-Apayao, four fatalities occurred. Throughout the nation, many roads were closed due to mudslides. There was significant destruction across rice fields, as well as tobacco and cotton plantations. The typhoon caused $56 million (1982 USD) in damage, which included $18 million from infrastructure and $26 million from agriculture. A total of 96 people died; 81 of the fatalities occurred in three provinces. Most of the deaths were by drowning. Thirty others were rendered as missing and 186 people were injured. A total of 12,464 dwellings were destroyed while 34,111 others were damaged. Furthermore, 301,431 people, or 51,532 families sought shelter due to the storm.

A total of 71 persons perished, 290 were injured. Around 72,000 homes were destroyed. Moreover, 194,000 people were left homeless, including 125,000 people in Vinh. In addition, many houses were submerged in Nghe Tinhe. Bình Trị Thiên was also affected by Nancy, but no casualties occurred there. Further north, the storm came close enough to Hong Kong to prompt a No 1. hurricane signal. All signals were dropped on October 16. Tate's Cairn observed a mere  of rain during the passage of the storm, and only cloudy skies with scattered showers were observed throughout the vicinity of Hong Kong.

See also

Typhoon Nalgae (2011)
Typhoon Vera (1983)
Typhoon Koppu

Notes

References

1982 Pacific typhoon season
Typhoons in the Philippines
Typhoons
Nancy